Dolní Benešov (formerly Benešov u Hlučína) is a town in Opava District in the Moravian-Silesian Region of the Czech Republic. It has about 3,900 inhabitants. It is part of the historical Hlučín Region.

Administrative parts
The village of Zábřeh is an administrative part of Dolní Benešov.

Geography
Dolní Benešov is located in the Opava Uplands. It lies near the Opava River, which forms the southern municipal border. There are two large ponds in the territory: Jezero and Nezmar.

History
The first written mention of Benešov is from 1312, as an estate of the Benešovice noble family. In 1371, its then owner Margrave John Henry exchanged Benešov for the Drahotuš Castle near Lipník nad Bečvou with the Drahotuš family. This family owned Benešov until the late 16th century. During their rule, the village prospered and developed, and in 1493 it received town privileges by King Vladislaus II.

In 1598, Benešov was illegally acquired by the Mošovský family during their re-Catholicization struggles. The town was then owned by the barons of Kalkreut in 1710–1774, by the Henneberk family in 1774–1846, and by the Rothschild family in 1846–1848.

During World War II, the village was the base for a working party (E444) of British and Commonwealth prisoners of war, under the administration of Stalag VIIIB/344 at Łambinowice in Poland. In January 1945, as the Soviet armies resumed their offensive and advanced from the east, and the prisoners were marched westward in The Long March. Many of them died from the bitter cold and exhaustion. The lucky ones got far enough to the west to be liberated by the Allied armies.

Culture
The annual meeting of youth wind orchestras Music Spring in the Hlučín Region takes place in the town.

Sport
The local football club FC Dolní Benešov plays in the Moravian-Silesian Football League (3rd tier of the Czech football league system).

Near the village of Zábřeh there is a small sports airport.

Sights

The local fortress from the 14th century was rebuilt into a Renaissance residence at the turn of the 16th and 17th centuries. In the 18th century, baroque modifications were made. The last extensive reconstruction is from the 1870s. Today the Dolní Benešov Castle houses the municipal office. The castle is surrounded by a  English park, which is freely accessible.

Twin towns – sister cities

Dolní Benešov is twinned with:
 Rajecké Teplice, Slovakia
 Wilamowice, Poland

References

External links

 

Populated places in Opava District
Cities and towns in the Czech Republic
Hlučín Region